The grey-chested babbler (Kakamega poliothorax), also known as the grey-chested kakamega or grey-chested illadopsis, is a species of bird in the family Modulatricidae. It is the only species in its genus.

It is found in the Cameroon line, western Kenya and the Albertine rift montane forests. Its natural habitat is subtropical or tropical moist montane forests.

References

Collar, N. J. & Robson, C. 2007. Family Timaliidae (Babblers)  pp. 70 – 291 in; del Hoyo, J., Elliott, A. & Christie, D.A. eds. Handbook of the Birds of the World, Vol. 12. Picathartes to Tits and Chickadees. Lynx Edicions, Barcelona.

grey-chested babbler
Birds of the Gulf of Guinea
Birds of Central Africa
grey-chested babbler
Taxonomy articles created by Polbot